Following is a table of United States presidential elections in Colorado, ordered by year. Since its admission to statehood in 1876, Colorado has participated in every U.S. presidential election.

Winners of the state are in bold. The shading refers to the state winner, and not the national winner.

See also
 Elections in Colorado

Notes

References